Eilema mesosticta is a moth of the subfamily Arctiinae. It was described by George Hampson in 1911. It is found in Cameroon, the Democratic Republic of the Congo, Ghana, Nigeria and Uganda.

References

mesosticta
Moths described in 1911
Moths of Africa